Metrodorus of Cos (fl. c. 460 BC) was the son of Epicharmus. Like several of his family he addicted himself partly to the study of Pythagorean philosophy, partly to the science of medicine. He wrote a treatise upon the works of Epicharmus, in which, on the authority of Epicharmus and Pythagoras himself, he maintained that the Doric was the proper dialect of the Orphic hymns.

Notes

References
 Iamblichus, The Life of Pythagoras, translated by Kenneth Sylvan Launfal Guthrie, Alpine, New Jersey, Platonist Press, 1919. Online version at ToposText.
 Smith, William, Dictionary of Greek and Roman Biography and Mythology, London (1873). Metrodo'rus, literary (1). 

5th-century BC Greek physicians
5th-century BC philosophers
Presocratic philosophers
Pythagoreans
Ancient Koans